Stanley Berryhill III (born June 8, 1998) is an American football wide receiver for the Detroit Lions of the National Football League (NFL). He played college football at Arizona.

Professional career

Atlanta Falcons
On May 2, 2022, Berryhill signed with the Atlanta Falcons as an undrafted free agent. He was waived on August 30, 2022.

Arizona Cardinals
On September 20, 2022, Berryhill signed with the practice squad of the Arizona Cardinals. He was released off the practice squad on October 18, 2022.

Detroit Lions
On October 19, 2022, Berryhill signed with the practice squad of the Detroit Lions. He was elevated to the active roster on October 27, 2022, and then reverted back to the practice squad after the game. He was signed to the active roster on November 5, then waived and re-signed to the practice squad. He signed a reserve/future contract on January 9, 2023.

References

1998 births
Living people
Arizona Cardinals players
American football wide receivers
Arizona Wildcats football players
Atlanta Falcons players
Detroit Lions players